Here is a list of hospitals in Lithuania.

Jonava Hospital - Jonava
Kėdainiai Hospital - Kėdainiai
Tauragė Hospital - Tauragė
Raseiniai Hospital - Raseiniai
Druskininkai Hospital - Druskininkai
Vilkaviškis Hospital - Vilkaviškis
Marijampolė Hospital - Marijampolė 
Prienai Hospital - Prienai
Visaginas Hospital - Visaginas
Panevėžys Hospital - Panevėžys
Šiauliai Hospital - Šiauliai
Rokiškis Psychiatric Hospital - Rokiškis
Rokiškis District Hospital - Rokiškis
Klaipėda Sailor's Hospital - Klaipėda
Republican Hospital of Klaipėda - Klaipėda
Klaipėda University Hospital - Klaipėda
Hospital of Lithuanian University of Health Sciences Kaunas Clinics - Kaunas
Kaunas Red Cross Hospital - Kaunas
Kazys Grinius Hospital - Kaunas
Vilnius University Children's Hospital-  Vilnius
Vilnius University Hospital Santaros Klinikos - Vilnius
Republican Vilnius Psychiatric Hospital - Vilnius
Republican Vilnius University Hospital - Vilnius
Vilkpėdė Hospital - Vilnius
Vilnius City Clinical Hospital - Vilnius
Vilnius City Mental Health Center - Vilnius
St. Roch's Hospital - Vilnius
Kardiolita - Vilnius

References

 List
Lithuania
Hospitals
Lithuania